The 2016–17 season is Rochdale's 110th year in existence and their third consecutive season in League One. Along with competing in League One, the club will participate in the FA Cup, League Cup and Football League Trophy.

The season covers the period from 1 July 2016 to 30 June 2017.

Statistics
																																			

|}

Transfers

In

Out

Loans in

Loans out

Competitions

Pre-season friendlies

League One

League table

Results by matchday

Matches

FA Cup

EFL Cup

EFL Trophy

References

Rochdale
Rochdale A.F.C. seasons